WOSTEP, the Watchmakers of Switzerland Training and Educational Program, is an internationally recognized professional qualification in the maintenance and care of fine-quality watches. It was devised by the Centre Suisse de Formation et de Perfectionnement Horloger and is sponsored by manufacturers and retailers within the horological industry in Switzerland.

Origin

During the 1960s, and at the request of the U.S. Government, the Swiss government created what would eventually evolve into WOSTEP- Federation of the Swiss Watch Industry FH. It was originally designed to train American watchmakers in techniques of watchmaking that developed in Geneva and the Jura mountains as from the 16th Century.

It is important to understand that at the time of the founding of Wostep, America was losing its title as "world's largest watch producer" to the Soviet Union (mostly making poor-quality everyday watches). As American watch companies continued to slide into oblivion after the end of World War II, some were able to update by purchasing movements from Swiss companies, even establishing their own subsidiaries in Switzerland (e.g. Waltham Watch Company, Hamilton Watch Company, Benrus, Bulova), to keep them going another 10–20 years before folding completely in the U.S. It was this reason that the U.S. requested some sort of formalized training for its best watchmakers.

There had always been a small number of imports of ultra-fine Swiss watches, but after WWII, the number of watches imported as partial or complete watches increased exponentially. These "modern" watch movements were markedly different from the products of American companies, which grew out of 100 years of production (starting mass production of quality watches). American manufacturers were unable to develop new products or methods of competing, and they were destroyed in record time.

Worldwide training programs

The Federation developed an 11-month training program in which a watchmaker was flown to Neuchâtel, Switzerland, and trained by any one of many talented instructors that worked at WOSTEP over the years.

Recent changes in structure have assured the survival of WOSTEP as a foundation with a beautiful lakefront chateau converted to the school building. With the retirement of long-time director Antoine Simonin and his wife, the next generation has taken the reins and continues to develop courses for full training used throughout the world at their WOSTEP-Partnership Schools. The school also provides a variety of industry-specific training to companies and practicing watchmakers.

External links
 
Simonin Publishers
Institute of Swiss Watchmakers

Horological organizations
Horology